Italy (ITA) competed at the 2005 Mediterranean Games in Almería, Spain.

Medals

Athletics

Men

Women

Others sport

Gold
 Boxing
Men's Light Flyweight (– 48 kg): Alfonso Pinto
Men's Lightweight (– 60 kg): Domenico Valentino
Men's Heavyweight (– 91 kg): Clemente Russo
Men's Super Heavyweight (+ 91 kg): Roberto Cammarelle

 Basketball
Men's Team Competition: Giorgio Boscagin (Bipop Carire), Marco Carraretto (Leche Rio Breogan), Alessandro Cittadini (Navigo Teramo), Christian Digiuliomaria (Sedima Roseto), Luca Garri and Jacopo Giachetti (both Lottomatica Roma), Davide Lamma (Montepaschi Siena), Marco Mordente (Bipop Carire Reggio Emilia), Andrea Pecile (Montepaschi Siena), Tomas Ress (Scavolini Pesaro), Mason Richard Rocca (Pompea Napoli), and Walter Santarossa (Lauretana Biella)

 Fencing
Men's Individual Foil: Marco Vannini
Men's Individual Sabre: Aldo Montano

 Judo
Men's Half-Middleweight (– 81 kg): Giuseppe Maddaloni
Women's Middleweight (– 70 kg): Ylenia Scapin

 Karate
Men's + 80 kg: Stefano Maniscalco
Men's Open Class: Stefano Maniscalco
Men's – 55 kg: Ciro Massa
Women's – 55 kg: Selene Guglielmi

 Rowing
Men's Single Sculls: Simone Raineri
Men's Coxless Pairs: Luca Agamennoni and Dario Lari
Men's Double Sculls: Alessio Sartori and Matteo Stefanini
Women's Single Sculls: Elisabetta Sancassani

 Shooting
Men's 10m Air Pistol: Francesco Bruno
Men's Trap: Giovanni Pellielo
Men's Skeet: Ennio Falco
Men's Double Trap: Marco Innocenti

 Swimming
Men's 200m Freestyle: David Berbotto
Men's 400m Freestyle: Massimiliano Rosolino
Men's 50m Breaststroke: Alessandro Terrin
Men's 4 × 200 m Freestyle: Matteo Pelliciari, Emiliano Brembilla, Christian Galenda, and David Berbotto
Women's 50m Freestyle: Cristina Chiuso
Women's 1500m Freestyle: Elisa Pasini
Women's 200m Backstroke: Alessia Filippi
Women's 50m Breaststroke: Giulia Fabbri
Women's 50m Butterfly: Elena Gemo
Women's 100m Butterfly: Ambra Migliori
Women's 200m Butterfly: Caterina Giacchetti
Women's 400m Medley: Alessia Filippi

Silver
 Fencing
Men's Individual Foil: Matteo Zennaro
Men's Individual Sabre: Luigi Tarantino
Women's Individual Foil: Claudia Pigliapoco

 Judo
Men's Half-Lightweight (– 66 kg): Giovanni Casale
Men's Heavyweight (+ 100 kg): Paolo Bianchessi
Women's Extra-Lightweight (– 48 kg): Francesca Congia

 Rowing
Men's Lightweight Coxless Pairs: Catello Amarante and Salvatore Amitrano

 Shooting
Men's 50m Rifle Prone: Roberto Facheris
Men's Trap: Massimo Fabbrizi
Men's Skeet: Andrea Benelli
Men's Double Trap: Daniele di Spigno

 Swimming
Men's 100m Freestyle: Filippo Magnini
Men's 200m Breaststroke: Paolo Bossini
Men's 50m Butterfly: Mattia Nalesso
Men's 100m Butterfly: Lorenzo Benatti
Men's 100m Medley: Alessio Boggiatto
Women's 800m Freestyle: Elisa Pasini
Women's 50m Freestyle: Elena Gemo
Women's 200m Breaststroke: Sara Giovannoni

 Water Polo
Men's Team Competition: Leonardo Binchi, Fabrizio Buonocore, Alessandro Calcaterra, Luigi Di Costanzo, Maurizio Felugo, Francesco Ferrari, Goran Fiorentini, Giovanni Foresti, Andrea Mangiante, Raffaele Onofrietti, Bogdan Rath, Fabio Violetti, and Antonio Vittorioso

Bronze
 Fencing
Men's Individual Épée: Federico Bollati
Women's Individual Foil: Marta Simoncelli
Women's Individual Épée: Sara Cristina Cometti
Women's Individual Épée: Veronica Ross

 Judo
Men's Extra-Lightweight (– 60 kg): Marco Caudana
Men's Middleweight (– 90 kg): Francesco Lepre
Women's Lightweight (– 57 kg): Laura Maddaloni
Women's Half-Middleweight (– 63 kg): Giulia Quintavalle
Women's Half-Heavyweight (– 78 kg): Lucia Morico
Women's Heavyweight (+ 78 kg): Barbara Andolina

 Karate
Men's – 70 kg: Giuseppe di Domenico
Women's + 65 kg: Greta Vitelli

 Rowing
Men's Lightweight Single Sculls: Lorenzo Bertini
Men's Lightweight Double Sculls: Leonardo Pettinari and Nicola Moriconi

 Shooting
Men's 50m Rifle Prone: Marco de Nicolo
Women's 10m Air Pistol: Manuela Franzoni

 Swimming
Men's 1500m Freestyle: Samuel Pizzetti
Men's 200m Butterfly: Francesco Vespe
Men's 4 × 100 m Medley: Enrico Catalano, Alessandro Terrin, Mattia Nalesso, David Berbotto
Women's 100m Freestyle: Cristina Chiuso
Women's 50m Butterfly: Francesca Segat
Women's 100m Butterfly: Francesca Segat
Women's 200m Butterfly: Francesca Segat
Women's 200m Medley: Alessia Filippi
Women's 4 × 200 m Freestyle: Simona Ricciardi, Alice Carpanese, Martina Cuppone, and Alessia Filippi
Women's 4 × 100 m Medley: Alessia Filippi, Veronica Demozzi, Ambra Migliori, and Alice Carpanese

See also
 Italy at the 2004 Summer Olympics
 Italy at the 2008 Summer Olympics

References
 Official Site
 juegosmediterraneos

Nations at the 2005 Mediterranean Games
2005
Mediterranean Games